SMS Freya was a protected cruiser of the , built for the German Imperial Navy (Kaiserliche Marine) in the 1890s, along with her sister ships , , , and . Freya was laid down at the Imperial Dockyard in Danzig in 1895, launched in April 1897, and commissioned into the Navy in October 1898.

Freya served in the German fleet for the initial years of her career, unlike her sister ships, all of which served abroad on foreign stations. As a result, she led a fairly uneventful career in the fleet. After a modernization in 1905–1907, Freya was used as a school ship for cadets. At the outbreak of World War I, Freya was mobilized into V Scouting Group, but served in front-line duty only briefly. She was used as a barracks ship after 1915, and ultimately sold for scrapping in 1921.

Design

In the early 1890s, elements in the German naval command structure grappled with what type of cruiser ought to be built to fulfill the various needs of the fleet. In the event, the RMA carried the day and three 6,000-ton cruisers were authorized in 1895. They resembled the larger s, designed at the same time, albeit at reduced scale.

Her propulsion system consisted of three vertical 4-cylinder triple-expansion steam engines, each driving a single screw propeller, with steam provided by twelve coal-fired Niclausse boilers. She had a crew of 31 officers and 446 enlisted men.

The ship was armed with a main battery of two  SK L/40 guns in single gun turrets, one forward and one aft. The guns were supplied with 58 rounds of ammunition each. Vineta also carried a secondary battery of eight  SK L/40 guns. Four were mounted in turrets amidships and the other four were placed in casemates, two abreast the conning tower and the others abreast the mainmast. She also carried ten  SK L/35 guns for defense against torpedo boats. The gun armament was rounded out by ten  Maxim machine cannon. She was also equipped with three  torpedo tubes with eight torpedoes, two launchers were mounted on the broadside and the third was in the bow, all below the waterline. 

In 1916, all of the ships of the class were disarmed, with the exception of Freya, which was re-equipped with a single 15 cm gun, four 10.5 cm SK L/45 guns, and fourteen 8.8 cm guns of both the L/30 and L/35 versions, for use as a gunnery training ship.

Her main and secondary battery turrets had 10 cm thick sides and the secondary casemates had the same level of protection. The conning tower had 15 cm thick sides.

Service history

Construction and fleet service
She was launched on 27 April 1897; Prince Heinrich of Prussia gave a speech at the ceremony and Queen Charlotte christened the ship. After completing fitting-out work, she began builder's sea trials, which revealed significant problems with her boilers, prompting the navy to issue a formal complaint to the manufacturer, Friedrich Krupp Germaniawerft, which was forced to provide replacements. Additional problems led the navy to turn to the British Thornycroft boiler, which the design staff of the RMA developed further, leading to what would become the Marine-type boiler. These would be used on most German warships thereafter. Freya was commissioned on 20 October 1898 for additional sea trials, conducted by the navy. During this period, she was officially assigned to II Division of I Battle Squadron, replacing the old ironclad warship , though she was not yet ready for active service. In March 1899, Freya was lightly damaged in a collision with a vessel under construction for the Ottoman Empire, after the latter vessel broke free from her moorings. The ship's first commander,  (KzS—Captain at Sea) Hugo Westphal, arrived aboard the ship in October 1900. Freya occasionally took part in training exercises with other elements of the fleet through mid-1901, though she remained on trials until 8 June, when she was decommissioned.

In the interest of developing the capabilities of the fleet's gunners, the navy established the Artillery Testing Command on 14 December 1901, and on 3 May 1902, Freya was recommissioned to join the new establishment.  (Frigate Captain) Hermann Jacobsen took command of the vessel at that time. She began training activities on 15 May, based in Kiel. Later that year, she was allocated to the training fleet for use as a scout for the annual large-scale maneuvers held every August and September. During the exercises, Freya suffered damage to her boilers that necessitated repairs that were completed on 15 September. She thereafter resumed her gunnery training duties, along with her tender, the old armored gunboat . The two vessels accidentally collided on 13 November but suffered no significant damage. The year 1903 passed much the same as the previous one, with gunnery training interrupted only by the fleet maneuvers in August and September. On 11 January 1904, Freya was again decommissioned in Wilhelmshaven.

Cadet training ship
By this time, the naval command had decided to convert the Victoria Louise-class ships into dedicated training ships for naval cadets and apprentice seamen, as they were no longer suitable for front-line service. They would replace the old screw corvettes that had been in use for that purpose for some time and were by then badly worn out. During the refit she was re-boilered; unlike her sister ships, which had their original three funnels reduced to two, Freya kept her original funnels. The refit was finished in early 1907, and she was recommissioned on 4 April, now under the command of KzS Franz von Holleben. She completed a short trials period, operating from Wilhelmshaven and then Kiel, before embarking her first class of trainees in early May. Freya then went on a short cruise in the western Baltic Sea before participating in the Kiel Week regatta.

Freya next embarked on a major training cruise on 19 July that included visits to Norway, various ports on the Atlantic coast of Europe, and the Canary Islands before entering the Mediterranean Sea. There, Freya visited a number of cities, including Venice, Italy, Beirut  in the Ottoman Empire, and Alexandria in the Khedivate of Egypt. The ship arrived back in Kiel on 18 March 1908. After embarking a new contingent of cadets and a new captain, KzS Leberecht Maass in April, Freya began the next training cruise, which started with maneuvers off Apenrade and in the North Sea, before crossing the Atlantic to visit North America. In August, Freya represented Germany at celebrations in Halifax, Canada, commemorating the 150th anniversary of the opening of the Canadian Parliament. While entering the port at around midnight on 9 August, she inadvertently rammed a schooner in heavy fog. Nine sailors were killed in the accident. Freya thereafter steamed south to visit ports in the Caribbean Sea. She arrived back in Kiel on 8 March 1909, where KzS Carl Schaumann relieved Maass.

Freyas third major cruise began on 2 June 1909, first with a visit to Norway, followed by a short return to Cuxhaven and then Wilhelmshaven, to make preparations to go abroad. From Wilhelmshaven, she got underway for the Mediterranean, stopping in Funchal in Madeira and Tenerife in the Canaries on the way. She steamed as far as the eastern Mediterranean, visiting Alexandria again, where she rendered assistance after a major fire in the city, along with ports in the Levant. Freya arrived back in Wilhelmshaven on 28 March 1910, where she went into dry dock for an overhaul that lasted until 2 May. She then moved to Kiel, where she took on another crew of cadets for a short training cruise to Norwegian waters that ended in Wilhelmshaven on 20 July.

On 1 August 1910, Freya departed for her next major voyage overseas; unlike previous years that included numerous stops while on the way, the ship steamed directly to Mexico with a special envoy aboard. There, she met the light cruiser , which was cruising off the coast of South America. The two ships represented Germany at celebrations marking the 100th anniversary of Mexico's independence from Spain. Freya disembarked the envoy in Veracruz, Mexico, on 3 September; he went on to meet the President of Mexico. On 16 September, the ship was present for the unveiling of a monument to Alexander von Humboldt, a German explorer and geographer who had surveyed much of Mexico in 1803–1804. Kaiser Wilhelm II donated the monument to Mexico. Freya got underway on 22 September for a cruise through the Caribbean before returning home, arriving in Kiel on 13 March 1911. She then proceeded to Danzig, where she was decommissioned on 28 March for another extensive modernization. This included replacing her troublesome Niclausse boilers with modern Marine-type boilers, and her third funnel was removed at this time. After completing the work in 1913, she was assigned to the reserve fleet, remaining out of commission.

World War I
Following the outbreak of World War I in July 1914, Freya was mobilized for active service, but she was initially only activated for use as a training ship for boiler room personnel. Following the reestablishment of the Training Inspectorate in April 1915, which had been closed at the start of the conflict, Freya returned to her old training duties in the Baltic. At that time, she moved from Kiel to Flensburg, where she remained through the end of the war. KzS Ernst-Oldwig von Natzmer took command of the vessel at that time, but he remained aboard only for four months, when he was replaced by KzS Wilhelm Goetze The old aviso  became Freyas tender starting in July. She was stricken on 25 January 1920 and used briefly as a barracks ship for police in Hamburg. She was ultimately broken up for scrap in Harburg in 1921.

Notes

References

Further reading
 

Victoria Louise-class cruisers
Ships built in Danzig
1897 ships
World War I cruisers of Germany